Greer is a city in Greenville and Spartanburg counties in the U.S. state of South Carolina. The population was 35,308 as of the 2020 census Greer is part of the Greenville–Anderson–Mauldin Metropolitan Statistical Area. The city is additionally part of the Greenville-Spartanburg-Anderson, SC Combined Statistical Area in Upstate South Carolina.

Greer is adjacent to Greenville-Spartanburg International Airport (GSP), which serves Greenville, Spartanburg, and the Upstate. Greer is also the site of the largest BMW manufacturing facility in North America. According to a June 2005 article in The Greenville News, BMW's Greer plant employs about 9,000 people, and has attracted dozens of suppliers in South Carolina, providing jobs for more than 12,000 people. Greer is home to the South Carolina Inland Port, an intermodal facility that receives and sends containers by rail to the Port of Charleston.

Geography

Greer is located at  (34.930304, -82.225052).

Greer has three lakes: Lake Robinson, Apalache Lake and Lake Cunningham. The South Tyger River runs through the northern part of Greer, part of the Broad River watershed.

Economy

Greer, SC has experienced great economic growth in recent years with headquarters of BMW US Manufacturing Company, Alexium International, and more.

History
Greer was named for James Manning Greer, whose ancestry traces from Scotland, through Ireland. Many of his descendants still reside in the region. James Manning Greer was a descendant of John Greer Sr., who surveyed his land in Laurens County in 1750.  John and his family were already in Laurens County, prior to the Greer passengers who arrived aboard the ship The Falls in 1764. John Greer's family settled at Duncans Creek between that Creek and the Enoree River and close to Duncan's Creek Presbyterian Church. John, Sr.'s great grandson James Manning Greer settled his family near Greenville in an area that eventually became Greer's Station.

The area now known as Greer was once part of the "Domain of the Cherokees" prior to the American Revolutionary War. In 1777, the area was added to the state of South Carolina. Development toward the birth of the town occurred in 1873, when the Richmond and Danville Air Line Railway (now the Norfolk Southern Railway) established a line between Atlanta and Charlotte. A station was built on land that belonged to James Manning Greer, and was named Greer's Station. The first post office was located in the new depot, Greer's Depot. That depot was a red brick, Victorian structure with a slate roof and a cupola. It was located immediately adjacent to the current Norfolk Southern rail line between Trade Street and Depot Street, facing toward Moore Street. It was demolished in 1976 by its then owner, the Southern Railway System, in order to avoid property taxes. When the town was incorporated in 1876, it was named Town of Greer's. One hundred years later, the name was officially changed to the City of Greer without an "s" on the end.

Merchants, blacksmiths and physicians set up shop in what is now the downtown area of Greer. In 1900, Greer's first bank, the Bank of Greer's, opened. The Piedmont and Northern Railway laid a second railroad line through Greer in 1914. With two active train lines, Greer became an attractive site for commerce. The railway meant big business for local farmers, enabling them to ship their crops, mainly cotton and peaches, out of state. Greer also became a textile-manufacturing center, with flourishing mills that included Victor, Franklin, Apalache and Greer Mills. The communities that grew up around the mills were as close-knit as the outlying farming communities.

In 1939, artist Winfred Walkley painted a mural, Cotton and Peach Growing, for the town's old post office as one of thirteen works commissioned by the U.S. Treasury Department's Section of Fine Arts between 1938 and 1941 for post offices and federal buildings throughout South Carolina.  The building is now home to the Greer Heritage Museum.

After World War II, the city began to grow and diversify its industrial base. A new hospital and high school were built. People came to downtown Greer from Spartanburg and Greenville to shop. In the early 1960s, Interstate 85 was opened, as well as the Greenville-Spartanburg International Airport. Imports derailed the textile industry in the 1970s and threatened to turn Greer into a ghost town, but the citizens of Greer worked together to attract new industry.

The Arthur Barnwell House, Davenport House, Gilreath's Mill, Greer Depot, Greer Downtown Historic District, Greer Post Office, Louie James House, R. Perry Turner House, Robert G. Turner House and Earle R. Taylor House and Peach Packing Shed are listed on the National Register of Historic Places.

Demographics

2020 census

As of the 2020 United States census, there were 35,308 people, 11,531 households, and 7,507 families residing in the city.

2000 census
As of the census of 2000, there were 16,843 people, 6,714 households, and 4,511 families residing in the city. The population density was 1,044.5 people per square mile (403.2/km2). There were 7,386 housing units at an average density of 458.0 per square mile (176.8/km2). The racial makeup of the city was 73.39% white, 19.49% African American, 1.16% Asian, 0.22% Native American, 0.06% Pacific Islander, 4.42% from other races, and 1.26% from two or more races. Hispanic or Latino of any race were 8.18% of the population. 21.6% were of American, 9.5% Irish, 8.9% German and 8.4% English ancestry according to Census 2000. 90.6% spoke English and 8.5% Spanish as their first language. Since 2000, the city has seen an explosive increase in Hispanic immigration.

There were 6,714 households, out of which 31.8% had children under the age of 18 living with them, 47.1% were married couples living together, 15.7% had a female householder with no husband present, and 32.8% were non-families. 27.9% of all households were made up of individuals, and 12.1% had someone living alone who was 65 years of age or older. The average household size was 2.47 and the average family size was 2.99.

In the city, the population was spread out, with 24.8% under the age of 18, 9.2% from 18 to 24, 33.4% from 25 to 44, 18.9% from 45 to 64, and 13.6% who were 65 years of age or older. The median age was 34 years. For every 100 females, there were 90.6 males. For every 100 females age 18 and over, there were 87.6 males.

The median income for a household in the city was $33,140, and the median income for a family was $41,864. Males had a median income of $33,147 versus $23,566 for females. The per capita income for the city was $17,546. About 12.2% of families and 15.8% of the population were below the poverty line, including 19.5% of those under age 18 and 15.1% of those age 65 or over.

Recreation
The city of Greer has a thriving recreation sports program. Greer Recreation (Greer Rec) has many sports opportunities. Their best accomplishments include the 2007 9–10 Little League softball state championship, and the 2019 6u Rookie Ball Dixie Youth Baseball State Championship. The 6u team went undefeated in a 12 team tournament held in West Columbia to give Greer baseball its first state Championship ever.

In the summer of 2010, the combined team of two schools, (Blue Ridge Middle School, and Greer Middle) the 11- to 12-year-old Little League softball team went to the regional tournament in Warner Robins, Georgia, but lost the first two games and was eliminated.

City Stadium in Greer is a WPA project completed in 1938; it currently seats 3,000. Throughout the years the stadium has hosted Little League, scholastic, The American Legion World Series, and semi-professional sports and received a major renovation in 1997. 

In 2012 the City of Greer successfully renovated the Cannon Center, a former National Guard armory that later became a basketball gym. The facility was originally built in 1936. The completed renovation included new office space, classroom space, dressing rooms for events/productions, and state of the art audio-visual equipment.

The City Recreation Department has been honored with South Carolina Recreation and Parks Agency of the Year twice since 2005. It also received the South Carolina Recreation and Parks Athletic Agency of the Year in 2009. The department is led by Ann Cunningham (Director) and Red Watson (Assistant Director).

Greer City Park is part of the City of Greer's Municipal Complex that was completed in 2008, the 12-acre Greer City Park is located adjacent to Greer City Hall and offers numerous recreational opportunities in Historic Greer Station.

Healthcare 
Greer is home to two hospitals and a cancer center which is undergoing an expansion.

Pelham Medical Center 
This hospital, part of Spartanburg Regional Healthcare System, focuses on medical and surgical patients. Pelham Medical Center is licensed for and operates 48 beds and is located at 250 Westmoreland Road. The facility provides emergency services, general surgery, gynecology, orthopedics, cardiology (non-invasive), endocrinology, gastroenterology, general medicine, oncology, and intensive care services. This campus includes Pelham Medical Center Medical Office Building, the Surgery Center at Pelham, and the Gibbs Cancer Center & Research Institute at Pelham.

Gibbs Cancer Center & Research Institute at Pelham 
Gibbs at Pelham provides radiation oncology and medical oncology services. In 2015, Gibbs at Pelham added the Cyberknife M6 system, which is the first of its kind in the southeastern United States and was the first system in the United States to treat with precision. Gibbs was the first in North or South Carolina, and one of the first cancer centers in the United States, to utilize a new tool for prostate cancer called the SpaceOAR® System. SpaceOAR is the first FDA-approved procedure for placing a ‘spacer’ to protect the rectum of men undergoing prostate cancer radiation.

In early 2018, Spartanburg Regional began construction on an expansion of its Gibbs Cancer Center & Research Institute at Pelham location. The 190,000-square-foot expansion is intended to provide cancer care for more patients along the border of Spartanburg and Greenville counties. It is anticipated that the construction will be completed in spring 2020.

Greer Memorial Hospital 
Located on Greenville Health System's Greer Medical Campus, Greer Memorial Hospital is an 82-bed facility with emergency, ICU and maternity care.

Transportation

Airports
Greer is served by the Greenville–Spartanburg International Airport Roger Milliken Field, which in 2012 handled over 1.7 million passengers. The airport is served by Allegiant Air, American Airlines, Delta Air Lines, Southwest Airlines, and United Airlines. Scheduled cargo service is offered by FedEx Express and UPS Airlines. Greer is also within  of Donaldson Center Airport, Greenville Downtown Airport, and Spartanburg Downtown Memorial Airport all general aviation facilities.

Railroads
Greer is served by Amtrak, the national passenger rail system, which operates to both Greenville and Spartanburg. Greer is the location of Inland Port Greer, one of two inland ports in South Carolina, built to handle containerized goods. Inland Port Greer is served by Norfolk Southern, and connects Greer to the Port of Charleston.

Highways
One two-digit Interstate highway runs through Greer. I-85 leads northeast  to Charlotte, North Carolina, and southwest  to Atlanta. U.S. Route 29 runs through Greer, connecting Greenville and Spartanburg. South Carolina Highway 14 and South Carolina Highway 290 both run through Greer. SC 14 leads north  to Landrum, near the North Carolina border, and south  to Simpsonville, while SC 290 leads east  to Duncan and northwest  to U.S. Route 25 north of Travelers Rest.

Education
Greer has a public library, a branch of the Greenville County Library System.

Notable people
Kris Bruton, Harlem Globetrotters; 1994 NCAA college dunk champion and 1994 NBA draft pick of the Chicago Bulls
Bill Haas, golfer; multiple winner on the PGA Tour and winner of the 2011 Fedex Cup
Jay Haas, golfer; multiple winner on the PGA Tour and Champions Tour
Kaleigh Kurtz, National Women's Soccer League player, North Carolina Courage, 2018-
Daniel Palka, Major League Baseball Player, Chicago White Sox, 2018- ; 2018 White Sox Team Home Run Leader. Also 2010 McDonald’s All American game player in basketball.

See also 
 List of municipalities in South Carolina

References

External links

 
 
 Greater Greer Chamber of Commerce

 
Cities in South Carolina
Cities in Greenville County, South Carolina
Cities in Spartanburg County, South Carolina
Upstate South Carolina